Psila is a European genus of flies which is a member of the family Psilidae or rust flies.

Genera

 Psila acmocephala
 Psila aethiopica
 Psila albiseta
 Psila amurensis
 Psila andreji
 Psila angustata
 Psila apicalis
 Psila arbustorum
 Psila asiatica
 Psila atlasica
 Psila atra
 Psila atrata
 Psila bicolor
 Psila bimaculata
 Psila bivittata
 Psila calobatoides
 Psila caucasica
 Psila celidoptera
 Psila clunalis
 Psila collaris
 Psila crassula
 Psila dichroa
 Psila dimidiata
 Psila dimorpha
 Psila dolichocera
 Psila dubia
 Psila emiliae
 Psila exigua
 Psila fallax
 Psila fenestralis
 Psila fimetaria
 Psila flavigena
 Psila freidbergi
 Psila freyi
 Psila frontalis
 Psila fulviseta
 Psila gracilis
 Psila hebraica
 Psila hennigi
 Psila hexachaeta
 Psila himalayensis
 Psila huashana
 Psila humeralis
 Psila indica
 Psila iwasai
 Psila jakutica
 Psila japonica
 Psila kanmiyai
 Psila kashmirica
 Psila kaszabi
 Psila kovalevi
 Psila krivosheinae
 Psila lateralis
 Psila levis
 Psila limbatella
 Psila lineata
 Psila longipennis
 Psila luteifrons
 Psila luteola
 Psila macra
 Psila maculata
 Psila maculipennis
 Psila magna
 Psila maritima
 Psila martineki
 Psila megacephala
 Psila melanocera
 Psila merdaria
 Psila merzi
 Psila michelseni
 Psila microcera
 Psila microphthalma
 Psila mixta
 Psila mongolica
 Psila morio
 Psila mucrifera
 Psila musiva
 Psila nartschukae
 Psila nartshukae
 Psila negrobovi
 Psila nemoralis
 Psila nigra
 Psila nigricollis
 Psila nigricornis
 Psila nigrifulva
 Psila nigripalpis
 Psila nigriseta
 Psila nigromaculata
 Psila nigrotaeniata
 Psila nitida
 Psila notata
 Psila obscuritarsis
 Psila orientalis
 Psila oxycera
 Psila ozerovi
 Psila pallida
 Psila pectoralis
 Psila perpolita
 Psila persimilis
 Psila potanini
 Psila problematica
 Psila pseudobicolor
 Psila pteropleuralis
 Psila pullata
 Psila qinlingana
 Psila quadrilineata
 Psila rossolimoae
 Psila rozkosnyi
 Psila rufa
 Psila sanguinolenta
 Psila sardoa
 Psila shatalkini
 Psila sibirica
 Psila silacruscula
 Psila sonora
 Psila stackelbergi
 Psila sternalis
 Psila strigata
 Psila subtilis
 Psila szechuana
 Psila tarbagotaica
 Psila tenebrica
 Psila tetrachaeta
 Psila tibetana
 Psila triorbiseta
 Psila washingtona
 Psila villosula

References

Psilidae
Muscomorph flies of Europe
Diopsoidea genera